The 2012 League of Ireland First Division season was the 28th season of the League of Ireland First Division. The First Division was contested by 8 teams and Limerick won the title.

Teams

Overview
Due to the expansion of the Premier Division, coupled with the withdrawal of Galway United during the off-season, the 2012 First Division  consisted of just eight teams. Applications to join the Division from Cobh Ramblers and Tralee Dynamos, both of whom had played in the 2011 A Championship, were rejected. Each team played every other team four times, totalling twenty eight games.

Final table

Results

Matches 1–14

Matches 15–28

Promotion/relegation play-off
The second and third placed First Division teams, Waterford United and Longford Town, played off to decide who would play Dundalk,
the eleventh placed team from the Premier Division. The winner of this play off would play in the 2013 Premier Division. 
First Division 

Waterford United win 3–1 on aggregate
First Division v Premier Division  

Dundalk win 4–2 on aggregate and retained their place in the Premier Division. Waterford United appealed the result of the playoff, claiming Michael Rafter was ineligible as Dundalk had incorrectly registered him when they signed him earlier that season. However the appeal was unsuccessful.

Top scorers

See also
 2012 League of Ireland Premier Division
 2012 League of Ireland Cup

References

 
League of Ireland First Division seasons
2012 League of Ireland
2012 in Republic of Ireland association football leagues
Ireland
Ireland